Emiliano Zapata is a 1970 Mexican drama film directed by Felipe Cazals and written, produced, and starring Antonio Aguilar as Emiliano Zapata. One of the first large-scale, expensive, and unconventional epics ever to be made in Mexico, the film was shot in 70 millimeters and gave Aguilar the opportunity to portray his favorite revolutionary character. The film features astounding sets, and also many extras. Aguilar avoided to sing in the film, in order to give the film more realism, although he was displeased at the finished project.

Cast
Antonio Aguilar as Emiliano Zapata
Jaime Fernández as Montaño
Mario Almada as Eufemio Zapata
Patricia Aspíllaga as Josefa Espejo
David Reynoso as Pancho Villa
Jorge Arvizu as Francisco Madero

Awards
Emiliano Zapata won Premio ACE Cinema awards for Film of the Year, Best Actor (Antonio Aguilar), and Best Director (Felipe Cazals).

References

External links

1970 films
Biographical films about rebels
Films directed by Felipe Cazals
Mexican Revolution films
1970s Spanish-language films
Films about Emiliano Zapata
Films scored by Paul Sawtell
1970s biographical films
Mexican biographical films
1970s Mexican films